A Trick of Hearts is a lost 1928 American silent Western film directed by B. Reeves Eason and starring Hoot Gibson. It was produced and distributed by Universal Pictures.

Plot
Carrie Patience has been elected as the new town sheriff.  In order to discredit the new sheriff, Ben Tully begins staging phony robberies while disguised as a woman.  Black Jack kidnaps Ben's girlfriend, Connie Meade.

Cast
 Hoot Gibson as Benjamin Franklin Tully
 Georgia Hale as Connie Meade
 Joe Rickson as Black Jack
 Rosa Gore as Sheriff Carrie Patience
 Howard Truesdale as Dad Tully
 Heinie Conklin as Blackface Comic
 George Ovey as Whiteface Comic
 Nora Cecil as The Mayor
 Dan Crimmins as The Ex Sheriff
 Grace Cunard as The Constable

See also

 Hoot Gibson filmography

References

External links
 
 

1928 films
Lost American films
Films directed by B. Reeves Eason
Universal Pictures films
Lost Western (genre) films
1928 Western (genre) films
American black-and-white films
1928 lost films
Silent American Western (genre) films
1920s American films